The Parnas Fountain is a fountain in Zelný trh square in Brno, Czech Republic. It is one of the most notable water fountains and baroque architectural monuments in Brno. It is a landmark of the square, located roughly in the middle of the square. Designed by Johann Bernhard Fischer von Erlach, it was built in 1690–1695 by Adam Tobiáš Kracker of Vienna.

References

Further reading
 SVITÁK, Zbyněk. Director operis kašny Parnas. In Jana Svobodová (ed.), Baroko. Příběhy barokního Brna. Brno: Muzeum města Brna, 2009. p. 44-49, .

Cultural infrastructure completed in 1695
European sculpture
Fountains in Europe
Brno
1695 establishments in the Holy Roman Empire